Alberto Fontana (born 23 January 1967) is an Italian former professional footballer who played as a goalkeeper.

During his career, in which he represented nine different clubs, he played until the age of 42. He played in 241 Serie A games during 15 seasons, representing in the competition Cesena, Bari, Atalanta, Napoli, Inter Milan, Chievo and Palermo.

Football career

Born in Cesena, Fontana started his career with his hometown club, A.C. Cesena, but made his professional debut with Vis Pesaro of Serie C2, where he was loaned during the 1986–87 season. Before the decade was over, he played on loan for Serie C1 club S.P.A.L.

In 1989 Fontana returned to Cesena, and made his Serie A debut with the Romagna side on 9 September 1990. After they suffered relegation at the end of the campaign he stayed for two further years, signing in the 1993 summer with A.S. Bari where he was first choice during his spell (two seasons apiece in each major division).

Aged 30, Fontana moved in 1997 to Atalanta BC, winning top-flight promotion in 2000. In January of the following year he was signed by S.S.C. Napoli, playing for the club for the following six months. During the summer he accepted an offer from F.C. Internazionale Milano, which were looking for a backup for Francesco Toldo; he eventually stayed four seasons and played in 24 official matches – ten in the league, two in the UEFA Champions League, four in the UEFA Cup and eight in the Coppa Italia.

In 2005 Fontana signed a one-year deal with A.C. Chievo Verona, playing regularly and being instrumental in the team's successful league campaign, which ended with qualification for the 2006–07 UEFA Cup. The club was ultimately admitted to the Champions League qualifying rounds following the 2006 Italian football scandal.

Subsequently, Fontana moved to U.S. Città di Palermo, with the initial aim being of serving as an experienced backup alongside young promise Federico Agliardi. However, an injury occurred to Agliardi, who additionally did not play impressively during the early matches of 2006–07, so Fontana was promoted to the starting lineup by Francesco Guidolin.

At the age of 40, Fontana was confirmed by Palermo for their 2007–08 season, starting for the Rosanero with impressively good results despite being the second-oldest player in the whole Serie A, only behind 44-year-old Marco Ballotta of S.S. Lazio, also a goalkeeper.

In 2008–09, he returned to the bench following the signing of Italian international Marco Amelia, only making his debut on 26 October 2008 as a half-time replacement to injured Amelia in a 1–3 home loss to ACF Fiorentina, a game that saw him being welcomed with a standing ovation from the whole stadium, a moment he later defined "the biggest emotion in my football career". He also played in the following match, against U.S. Lecce.

In December 2008 Fontana was put out of the first-team squad, after disagreements with the club regarding his position in the squad – he was demoted to as low as third choice, behind Albanian youngster Samir Ujkani. Palermo chairman Maurizio Zamparini then confirmed to have formally authorized him to start searching a new club where he could play regularly, but the player eventually stayed until the end of the campaign, retiring shortly after.

Personal life
Fontana is not related to another football goalkeeper, also named Alberto Fontana, who also had an extensive professional career, also appearing for a host of clubs. As his footballing namesake, he was nicknamed Jimmy after singer Jimmy Fontana.

Honours
Inter
Coppa Italia: 2004–05

References

External links

Gazzetta dello Sport profile (2006–07)  

1967 births
Living people
People from Cesena
Footballers from Emilia-Romagna
Italian footballers
Association football goalkeepers
Serie A players
Serie B players
Serie C players
A.C. Cesena players
Vis Pesaro dal 1898 players
S.P.A.L. players
S.S.C. Bari players
Atalanta B.C. players
S.S.C. Napoli players
Inter Milan players
A.C. ChievoVerona players
Palermo F.C. players
Sportspeople from the Province of Forlì-Cesena